The Naked Street is a 1955 American crime film noir directed by Maxwell Shane.  The drama features Farley Granger, Anthony Quinn and Anne Bancroft.

Plot
Phil Regal (Anthony Quinn), a tough racketeer, pulls strings to get his pregnant unmarried sister Rosalie's punk boyfriend, Nicky, out of a death penalty sentence for killing Barricks, so that they can get married. Later, after Rosalie loses the baby and Phil learns that Nicky is cheating on her, the gangster arranges for Nicky to be framed for a murder. Nicky threatens to expose how Phil got Nicky out of the first murder rap.  Nicky is executed for the murder.  Phil dies while trying to escape the police.

Farley Granger later said that he thought the movie was "preachy, trite, and pedestrian," although he welcomed the opportunity to work with Anthony Quinn and Anne Bancroft.

Cast
 Farley Granger as Nicholas 'Nicky' Bradna
 Anthony Quinn as Phil Regal
 Anne Bancroft as Rosalie Regalzyk
 Peter Graves as Joe McFarland, journalist at New York Chronicle
 Else Neft as Mrs. Regalzyk
 Sara Berner as Millie Swadke
 Jerry Paris as Latzi Franks
 Mario Siletti as Antonio Cardini
 James Flavin as Attorney Michael X. Flanders
 Whit Bissell as District Attorney Blaker
 Joe Turkel as Shimmy
 Joyce Terry as Margie
 Harry Tyler as I. Barricks
 Jerry Hausner as Louie
 Lee van Cleef as Harry Goldisch (uncredited)
 Jeanne Cooper as Evelyn (uncredited)

Reception
When the film was released, The New York Times film critic, Bosley Crowther, panned the film, writing, "The whole spectacle is dismal and uninspiring. The only cheerful thing that occurs is that the sister and wife, played by Anne Bancroft, falls in love with and marries a newspaper man."  The Buffalo Evening News praised the acting of Quinn, Bancroft, and Granger, but was critical overall: "If there were not a ribbon of ludicrousness running through its violence and brutality-laden scenes, one could call it vicious. TV Guide rated it 3/5 stars and called it a "solid, fast-paced crime tale".

Shown on the Turner Classic Movies show 'Noir Alley' with Eddie Muller on September 17, 2022.

See also
List of American films of 1955

References

External links
 
 
 
 
 The Naked Street film clip at YouTube

1950s American films
1950s English-language films
1955 films
1955 crime drama films
American black-and-white films
American crime drama films
Films directed by Maxwell Shane
Films produced by Edward Small
Film noir
Films scored by Emil Newman
Films scored by Ernest Gold
Films set in New York City
United Artists films